Fay-Usborne Mill is a historic grist mill and feed store located at Westfield in Chautauqua County, New York. The original two story, frame feed mill was built in 1899 by James C. Harris.  It was purchased in 1913 by John R. Fay who, with his partner Thomas Usborne, expanded the business to include a variety of grain and cereal processing machines.

It was listed on the National Register of Historic Places in 1983.

References

Grinding mills on the National Register of Historic Places in New York (state)
Industrial buildings completed in 1899
Buildings and structures in Chautauqua County, New York
Grinding mills in New York (state)
1899 establishments in New York (state)
National Register of Historic Places in Chautauqua County, New York